Amedee Valle Reyburn, Jr. (March 25, 1879 – February 10, 1920) was an American freestyle swimmer and water polo player who competed in the 1904 Summer Olympics.

In the 1904 Olympics he won bronze medals as a member of American 4x50 yard freestyle relay team and as a member of Missouri Athletic Club water polo team. Reyburn died in a plane crash in 1920.

See also
 List of athletes with Olympic medals in different disciplines
 List of Olympic medalists in swimming (men)

References

External links
 

1879 births
1920 deaths
Sportspeople from St. Louis
American male freestyle swimmers
American male water polo players
Olympic bronze medalists for the United States in swimming
Olympic medalists in water polo
Olympic water polo players of the United States
Swimmers at the 1904 Summer Olympics
Water polo players at the 1904 Summer Olympics
Medalists at the 1904 Summer Olympics
Victims of aviation accidents or incidents in 1920
Victims of aviation accidents or incidents in the United States